The BYD M6 is a 7- seater MPV made by Chinese car maker BYD.

A minor facelift was later introduced in 2013 featuring clear headlamps replacing the smoked headlamps of the pre-facelift model.

History
Officially introduced during the 2010 Beijing Auto Show, BYD entered the MPV market in 2009 by launching the M6.

Design
A Wikileaks cable from Guangzhou mention that the M6 was apparently based closely on the Toyota Previa. The resemblance is reflected on the car's design.

Gallery

References

M6
Minivans
Cars introduced in 2010
2010s cars